The 1995 SEC Men’s Basketball Tournament took place from March 9–12, 1995 at the Georgia Dome in Atlanta, Georgia. The Kentucky Wildcats won the tournament and the SEC’s automatic bid to the 1995 NCAA Men’s Division I Basketball Tournament by defeating the Arkansas Razorbacks in a 95–93 overtime win.

Television coverage 
The entire tournament was regionally televised and syndicated by Jefferson Pilot Sports. JP Sports, at the time, was in its eighth season in covering SEC Basketball, and the 1995 tournament was the fourth time that Jefferson Pilot Sports covered the entire tournament. However, the championship game was also broadcast by ESPN2 in areas outside the SEC’s geographical footprint, meaning that the ESPN2 broadcast was blacked out in areas where Jefferson Pilot’s broadcast was available on a local station.

Tournament notes 
This was the first time the Georgia Dome served as the home of the SEC Men’s Basketball Tournament.

Bracket

References

SEC men's basketball tournament
1994–95 Southeastern Conference men's basketball season
March 1995 sports events in the United States
1995 in sports in Georgia (U.S. state)
1995 in Atlanta
College sports in Georgia (U.S. state)
Basketball in Georgia (U.S. state)